Association Sportive de Furiani-Agliani is a French association football club. They are based in the town of Furiani, located on the island of Corsica and their home stadium is the Stade du Bastio. As of the 2019–20 season, they play in the Championnat National 3 Group D.

Current squad

References

External links
AS Furiani-Agliani official website  
AS Furiani-Agliani at FFF.fr 

Furiani
Football clubs in France
Sport in Haute-Corse
1987 establishments in France
Association football clubs established in 1987